George Christopher Band  (2 February 1929 – 26 August 2011) was an English mountaineer. He was the youngest climber on the 1953 British expedition to Mount Everest on which Edmund Hillary and Tenzing Norgay made the first ascent of the mountain. In 1955, he and Joe Brown were the first climbers to ascend Kangchenjunga, the third highest mountain in the world.

Biography
George Band was born in Taiwan and educated at Eltham College. He did his National Service with the Royal Corps of Signals and read Geology at Queens' College, Cambridge, followed by Petroleum Engineering at Imperial College, London.

Having started climbing in the Alps while a student at Queens', he was the youngest climber on the 1953 British expedition to Mount Everest on which Edmund Hillary and Tenzing Norgay made the first ascent of the mountain. Two years later he and Joe Brown became the first climbers to ascend Kangchenjunga, the third highest mountain in the world on the 1955 British Kangchenjunga expedition. Out of respect for the religious feelings of the people of Nepal and Sikkim, they stopped about ten feet below the actual summit.

Following these early mountaineering successes, George Band spent most of his professional life in oil and gas exploration. In 2005, aged 76, Band made the trek to the south-west Base Camp of Kangchenjunga in Nepal. He was president of the Alpine Club and the British Mountaineering Council, and he traveled around the world. He wrote the books, Road to Rakaposhi and in 2003, Everest 50 Years on Top of the World (the official history - Mount Everest Foundation, Royal Geographical Society and the Alpine Club). In 2007 he wrote " Summit", a book celebrating 150 years of the Alpine Club. He was Chairman of the Himalayan Trust (UK). George Band was an Appeal Patron for BSES Expeditions, a youth development charity that operates challenging scientific research expeditions to remote wilderness environments. 

George Band was appointed Officer of the Order of the British Empire (OBE) in the 2009 New Year Honours.

George Band died of natural causes in Hampshire, England, UK, on 26 August 2011, aged 82.

Books published 
 Road to Rakaposhi (1955)
 Everest: 50 Years on Top of the World (2003)
 Summit (2006), a celebration of 150 years of the Alpine Club.

Footnotes

External links
Obituary of George Band, The Daily Telegraph, 28 August, 2011

1929 births
2011 deaths
Alumni of Imperial College London
Alumni of Queens' College, Cambridge
English mountain climbers
Historians of mountaineering
Officers of the Order of the British Empire
Presidents of the Alpine Club (UK)
People educated at Eltham College
20th-century British Army personnel
Royal Corps of Signals soldiers